Waterlemon Cay is a small cay surrounded by a fringing reef located in Leinster Bay on Saint John, U.S. Virgin Islands.  It is named after the water lemon.

The cay is surrounded by a fringing reef, and is considered to be one of the best snorkeling spots on the island. A trail leads from the sandy beach at Leinster Bay approximately  along the point, from which is a ten-minute swim to the cay, where there is a small beach. The cay boasts a wide variety of reef fishes and coral, however bleaching is prevalent, and the marine life has decreased in recent times. Many attribute the depletion of Coral reefs of the Virgin Islands to high rates of erosion and runoff caused by the construction boom on the Islands.

History 
Local lore states that when dueling was outlawed in the Danish West Indies, the remote strip of sand on Waterlemon Cay became the preferred spot to engage in combat.

Gallery

References

External links
 St John Beach Guide: Waterlemon Cay

Beaches of the United States Virgin Islands
Landforms of Saint John, U.S. Virgin Islands
Islands of the United States Virgin Islands